Phibalpteryx is a genus of moths in the family Geometridae.

Species 
 Phibalpteryx virgata (Hufnagel, 1767)

References 

Geometridae